Jones & Stephenson is a Belgian music duo mainly focusing on hard dance music. Jones' real name is Frank Sels (also known as Franky Jones) and Stephenson's full name is Axel Stephenson.

In 1993 they made the classic hardcore techno/hard trance record "The First Rebirth", released on Bonzai Records. This song is considered as one of the foundations of the Dutch gabber/hardcore music genre. When this song was re-released in 2002 it reached the number 1 spot in the Belgian dance charts.

References

External links
 Jones & Stephenson at Discogs

Belgian dance music groups
Belgian musical duos